Harry Francis Craft (April 19, 1915 – August 3, 1995) was an American Major League Baseball player and manager. Born in Ellisville, Mississippi, he was a center fielder for the Cincinnati Reds from 1937 to 1942.

From 1962 through September 18, 1964, Craft was the first manager in Houston's Major League history as skipper of the expansion Houston Colt .45s, later the Astros. Earlier, he managed the Kansas City Athletics (August 6, 1957–1959) and he was the "head coach" of the Chicago Cubs (April 26–May 10 and June 2–4, 1961).

Playing career
A top-flight defensive outfielder, Craft was an average hitter in his short career. His best season came, basically, as a rookie (he had 42 at bats the previous season) in 1938. On June 15 of that year, Craft caught the ninth-inning pop fly (batted by Leo Durocher) to make the final out in the historic game that gave Johnny Vander Meer his second consecutive no-hitter. That same season, Craft batted a solid .270 as the Reds' everyday center fielder with 15 home runs and 83 RBIs in 151 games. He had 165 hits that season in 612 at bats. All those numbers ended up being career-highs. The next two years were Cincinnati's best seasons as they went to the World Series in both, winning in 1940 against the Detroit Tigers. However, Craft did not play a large part in the victory, having only 1 at bat. He ended up with just one postseason hit, which came the year before.

On June 8, 1940, he hit for the cycle in a 23–2 win over the Brooklyn Dodgers. Craft joined the Navy in 1943.

In six seasons, Craft had an all-time .253 batting average with 533 hits, 85 doubles, 25 triples, 44 home runs and 267 RBIs. He accumulated 14 stolen bases and 237 runs scored. His lifetime fielding percentage was .986.

Managerial career

Minor leagues

Craft began his managing career in the farm system of the New York Yankees in 1949. That season, he was Mickey Mantle's first manager in professional baseball with  the Independence Yankees of the Kansas–Oklahoma–Missouri League. In 1950, Craft managed Mantle again with the Joplin Miners in the Western Association. Eventually, Craft progressed to the Triple-A level with the Kansas City Blues of the American Association in 1953–1954.

"I was lucky to have Harry as skipper my first two years", Mantle said years later. "He started me out right."   Craft would also manage Roger Maris at the Major League level in 1958–1959 with the Kansas City Athletics, just before the young right fielder was traded to the Yankees. Maris credited Craft with helping him with his hitting.

Major League

Kansas City Athletics
Craft went from the minor league Blues to the Major League Athletics in 1955, their first year in Kansas City after transferring from Philadelphia, when he was named a coach on the staff of Lou Boudreau. After over  losing seasons, Boudreau was released on August 6, 1957, and Craft was named his successor. Craft's Athletics went 23–27 to finish the  season. Craft finished with a 162–196 record at Kansas City. His best finish was seventh place in the eight-team American League.

Chicago Cubs
A year after joining the coaching staff of the 1960 Chicago Cubs, Craft became a member of Cubs' owner Phil Wrigley's ill-fated College of Coaches. From 1961 to 1965, the team had no permanent manager, and rotated the "head coach" job among its coaching staff.

During 1961, Craft briefly returned to managing in the minors for the Triple-A Houston Buffs of the American Association. He would be the last manager for the minor-league Buffs, before being promoted to become the first skipper of Houston's Major League expansion team when the Houston Colt .45s entered the National League in 1962.

Houston Colt .45s
Craft managed the Colt .45s from 1962 to 1964, before his replacement by Lum Harris in the closing days of the 1964 season. His first team, the 1962 Colt .45s, finished eighth in the ten-team league, but six full games ahead of the ninth-place Cubs, then in their 87th year in the NL. But in 1963 and 1964, the Colt .45s fell into ninth place, ahead of only their expansion brethren, the New York Mets.

Craft ended 191–280 with the Colt .45s, never having managed an above .500 team in all or parts of seven seasons as a big league manager. He remained in the game, however, as a scout and farm system official for the Baltimore Orioles, San Francisco Giants and the Yankees, retiring in 1991.

Craft ended his managing career with a 360–485 record in 849 games, a .426 winning percentage. His best finish was seventh place. The authors of one baseball book had this to say about Craft's career, perhaps unfairly given what little he had to work with on those clubs: "Of course, if you are really lousy at what you do, there's always a chance you can work your way into management, that being the American Way... Harry Craft managed three teams in a seven year span... They finished 7th, 7th, 7th, 7th, 8th, 9th and 9th. Do I detect a trend in there somewhere?"

Death
Harry Craft died after a long illness in Conroe, Texas, at the age of 80 on Thursday, August 3, 1995.

See also
 List of Major League Baseball players to hit for the cycle

References

Further reading

External links

Harry Craft at SABR (Baseball BioProject)

1915 births
1995 deaths
Baseball players from Mississippi
Chicago Cubs coaches
Chicago Cubs managers
Cincinnati Reds players
El Dorado Lions players
Houston Buffaloes managers
Houston Colt .45s managers
Kansas City Athletics coaches
Kansas City Athletics managers
Kansas City Athletics scouts
Kansas City Blues (baseball) managers
Kansas City Blues (baseball) players
Major League Baseball center fielders
Mississippi College Choctaws baseball players
Mississippi College Choctaws football players
Mississippi College Choctaws men's basketball players
New York Yankees scouts
People from Ellisville, Mississippi
San Antonio Missions managers
San Francisco Giants scouts
Sportspeople from Joplin, Missouri
Syracuse Chiefs players
Waterloo Reds players
United States Navy personnel of World War II